Alypiodes is a genus of moths of the family Noctuidae. Moths in this genus are commonly called forester moths.

Species
 Alypiodes bimaculata (Herrich-Schäffer, 1853), Two-spotted forester moth
 Alypiodes flavilinguis (Grote, 1883)
 Alypiodes geronimo (Barnes, 1900), Geronimo forester
 Alypiodes radians (Felder, 1874), Radiant Moth
 Alypiodes walkeri (Druce, 1888)

References
 Alypiodes at Markku Savela's Lepidoptera and Some Other Life Forms
 Natural History Museum Lepidoptera genus database

Agaristinae
Noctuoidea genera